Abbasabad (also Romanized as ‘Abbāsābād) is a village in Rahmat Rural District, Seyyedan District, Marvdasht County, Fars Province, Iran. At the 2006 census, its population was 602, in 145 families.

References 

Populated places in Marvdasht County